Isa is a rural locality (a settlement) in Isinsky Selsoviet of Selemdzhinsky District, Amur Oblast, Russia. The population was 433 as of 2018. There are 11 streets.

Geography 
Isa is located 294 km southwest of Ekimchan (the district's administrative centre) by road.

References 

Rural localities in Selemdzhinsky District